Orsoya is a village in Northwestern Bulgaria. Its name has Latin origins, namely Ursus, which stands for bear.
It is located close to the Danube River, in Lom Municipality, Montana Province, 14 km. west of Lom. In Orsoya village is the  protected "Ribarnitsi Orsoya" area. A necropolis was found nearby. Regular transportation links include buses to and from Lom and Vidin. There is a Community centre, a Post Office, and a Clinic. There is a large woods area surrounding the village, and a spring.

Orsoya Rocks in the South Shetland Islands, Antarctica are named after the village.

See also
List of villages in Montana Province

Villages in Montana Province